For articles listing various university leaders around the world, please see individual national articles from the following countries:

List of Australian university leaders
List of British university chancellors and vice-chancellors
List of Canadian university leaders
List of Hong Kong university vice-chancellors and presidents
List of Malaysian university leaders
List of New Zealand university leaders
List of South African university chancellors and vice-chancellors
List of Tanzanian university chancellors and vice-chancellors
List of Ugandan university leaders
List of leaders of universities and colleges in the United States